Beyond the Rockies may refer to:
 Beyond the Rockies (1932 film), an American Pre-Code Western film
 Beyond the Rockies (1926 film), an American silent Western film